Kan Jong-woo (born April 11, 1982) is a South Korean singer and songwriter. He is a twin brother of singer Kan Jong-wook. They have formed a K-pop vocal duo called J2 in 2010. Their first single "Missing" was used as the title track for movie Man of Vendetta. Kan has written over 60 lyrics including major South Korean national TV shows' OSTs like Apgujeong Midnight Sun, Royal Family, Princess Aurora, Pink Lipstick, Bravo, My Love!, and Gloria.

Personal life 
Kan graduated from Pratt Institute, both undergraduate and graduate school, and has BFA in Interior Design and Masters in communication design. He currently lives in New York City working as a designer.

References 

1982 births
Living people
South Korean male singers
Pratt Institute alumni
South Korean expatriates in the United States